Indra Ové (born 14 October 1967) is a British film, television and stage actress.

Career
Ové was born in Westminster, London. She trained at the Central School of Speech and Drama. She appeared in the 1994 film Interview with the Vampire portraying a New Orleans prostitute who interacts with Tom Cruise's Lestat. She had a small role in The Fifth Element (1997) as a VIP stewardess with whom Chris Tucker's character flirts, was in Othello (playing Bianca to Laurence Fishburne's lead) and had a small role (as Ella Fontaine) in Resident Evil. Her television roles include the British children's series The Latchkey Children and The New Worst Witch, the British–German sci-fi co-production Space Island One and the British medical drama television series Holby City.  She also appeared in a 1992 episode of Desmond's, playing Samantha. Ové appeared in a 1994 episode of  Soldier Soldier, playing Melanie Burrows and also in a 1999 two-part Bugs story as Zephr. In 2019, Ové appeared as a First Order officer in Star Wars: The Rise of Skywalker.

She is the sister of artist/director Zak Ové and the daughter of pioneer Trinidad-born filmmaker Horace Ové.

Filmography

Film

Television

References

External links

Living people
1968 births
Actresses from London
Alumni of the Royal Central School of Speech and Drama
British stage actresses
Black British actresses
British people of Trinidad and Tobago descent